Vormsund is a village in the municipality of Nes, Akershus, Norway. Its population (2005) is 461.

References

Villages in Akershus
Nes, Akershus